Lepidorhombus is a genus of turbots native to the northeastern Atlantic Ocean.

Species
There are currently two recognized species in this genus:
 Lepidorhombus boscii (A. Risso, 1810) (Four-spot megrim)
 Lepidorhombus whiffiagonis (Walbaum, 1792) (Megrim)

References

Scophthalmidae
 
 
Taxa named by Albert Günther
Marine fish genera